Bhavarlal Hiralal Jain (12 December 1937 – 25 February 2016) was an Indian entrepreneur, and the founder chairman of Jain Irrigation Systems Ltd. (JISL), now the second largest micro-irrigation company in the world. He was a staunch Gandhian and philanthropist. He was the founder of Gandhi Research Foundation.

Life (1937 to 2016)
Bhavarlal Jain was born in 1937 into a farming Marwari Oswal Jain family, originally in the village of Wakod located in Jalgaon district, Maharashtra,. A law graduate, he spurned the offer of a civil service job to pursue agriculture as a profession at the age of twenty-three. In 1963, selling kerosene from a pushcart, Jain started the family business. The family formed a partnership with a meagre ₹ 7,000, the accumulated savings of three generations, as capital. In 1972–74, Jain decided to revert to his ancestral farms from trading and business. In 1980, he established a PVC pipe manufacturing operation. In 1987–88, he set up a public corporation – the first of its kind in the private sector in the Khandesh region – for the production, promotion and propagation of drip irrigation in the country. He purchased a piece of land that was lying between a hill and the Jalgaon – Pachora road. The revenue classification of the land was less than that of degraded land. He converted this land into cultivable land, now recognised as the Jain Hills and Jain Valley, or Jain Agri Park and Jain Food Park. Then, he went on to pioneer the concept of micro irrigation in India. He received many awards and accolades for outstanding work in agriculture including the prestigious Crawford Reid Memorial Award instituted by the Irrigation Association, USA for "Significant achievements in promoting proper irrigation techniques and in fostering major advancements in the Industry outside the United States of America" in 1997. He was the first Indian and the second Asian to receive this honour. He was greatly influenced by the Jain teachings of Ahimsa (non-violence) and Anekāntavāda (multiplicity of view points).

Jain died at Jaslok Hospital in Mumbai on 25 February 2016 from multi-organ failure, septicaemia, and listeriosis.

Works

Inspired by a quote, "Agriculture: a profession with future", Jain added dealerships for tractors, sprinkler systems, PVC pipes, and other farm equipment. To broaden the business base, he also added agencies for farm inputs such as fertilizers, seeds, and pesticides. His business grew from Rs. 1 million in 1963 to Rs. 110 million in 1978.

Jain did a considerable amount of work particularly regarding water management systems. At JISL's modern  research and development farm, work takes place to provide cost effective measures for wasteland development, soil and water conservation, greenhouse, fertilisation, adoption of bio-pesticides and bio-fertilisers, effective farm management and improving productivity for horticultural crops. 'Grand Nain'- a tissue cultured banana variety introduced by him has emerged as the leading variety with banana farmers in Maharashtra.

He strove hard to earn a place of pride for Indian agriculture by augmenting yields and adding value using technology.

In July 2007, he founded the Anubhuti School, a strictly vegetarian, residential school with a difference which judiciously blends classroom learning with experiential project work. This school recently achieved the Green School Award.

Jain was the managing trustee of Jain Charities, an organisation dedicated to social causes like education and rural development. The organisation is now known as 'Bhavarlal and Kantabai Jain Multipurpose Foundation'.

Writings
Jain authored many books in English and Marathi. The following table contains his writings listed by year of publication. His speeches, articles and interviews have been collected and published extensively.

Awards and recognitions
Jain received 22 International and National Awards. He was conferred the prestigious UNESCO-West-Net Water Conserver of India award in November 2007 by the Honourable Union Minister of Water Resources, Professor Saif-Ud-Din Soz at a function held in New Delhi attended by eminent delegates from the World Bank, UNICEF, UNESCO, the Central Water Commission and TERI.

In 2008, he was awarded the Padma Shri, India's fourth highest civilian award by the Government of India. The North Maharashtra University awarded him the degree of Doctor of Letters (Honoris causa) for "Remarkable achievements in the field of agriculture, industry and social work". Maharana Pratap University of Agriculture and Technology, Rajasthan and Konkan Krishi Vidhyapith, Maharashtra awarded the degrees of Doctor of Science (Honoris Causa) to him for "tremendous service to the nation by putting up Research Projects and Drip Irrigation Projects which is a unique boon to the agriculturists all over"; and "Significant Contribution in the field of Agriculture, Horticulture, Micro Irrigation & Water Conservation" respectively. In 2012, he was awarded The Good Company Award by Forbes.

References
Citations

Bibliography

External links
 Bhavarlal Jain Official website
 Gandhi Research Foundation, Gandhi Teerth, Jalgaon
 World Record of Largest Pipe Mosaic of Padmashree Bhavarlal Jain made by Jain Irrigation Systems

1937 births
2016 deaths
20th-century Indian businesspeople
20th-century Indian non-fiction writers
Businesspeople from Maharashtra
Indian agriculturalists
Indian business writers
Marathi-language writers
People from Jalgaon district
Rajasthani people
Recipients of the Padma Shri in science & engineering
Writers from Maharashtra